Davao Metro Shuttle Corporation (DMS), also known as Davao Metro Shuttle Bus Company, Inc., is a large bus company in Mindanao, Philippines. It operates bus transport services in and outside Davao Region with its headquarters, main garage and offices in Davao City. Its main terminals are located in Davao City and Tagum.

History
Davao Metro Shuttle started as a local taxi service in 1995 serving the city of Davao in what has been a partnership between businessmen Reynaldo T. Uy (who later went on to be mayor of Tagum) and Reynaldo Alba. When it procured its first air-conditioned bus units in 1996, its first service was the Davao-Digos route. In 1998 the company started servicing the Davao-Tagum route after purchasing 20 non-aircon bus units. In 1998 their range of service once again expanded when they started servicing the Davao-Kidapawan route using Daewoo buses.

As time went on, and as the company went cycles of financial setbacks and recovery, its service routes expanded greatly on time to include Bansalan, Malita, Monkayo, Compostela, New Bataan, & Laak.

The Davao Metro shuttle is set to launch the Go-Mindanao Tour Bus program in 2017, an initiative supported by the Department of Tourism. They are targeting to launch the route by March next year which would initially travel from the city to Bukidnon, Cagayan de Oro and Butuan.

On 2 August 2017 the company started servicing the Davao-Butuan-Nasipit route for the first time using Guilin Daewoo buses. Shortly thereafter the company's Go-Mindanao Tour Bus program officially commenced operation as a few of its units, specifically high-deck buses procured from Zhengzhou Yutong Bus covered with stickers of the Go-Mindanao Tour Bus brand, started plying the Davao-Butuan and Davao-New Bataan routes.

On 8 November 2018 the company, under its Go-Mindanao Tour Bus subsidiary brand, started plying the Butuan-Bislig route using then newly acquired Golden Dragon luxury buses, marking the first instance that, although the company bears the namesake of the city and the situate region it was mainly serving and based from, the company served completely outside its main areas of operation.

On 15 June 2022, the company entered the Davao-Manila overland route, marking the first time it serviced areas in Luzon and finally entered service in all three major Philippine island groups.

Fleet
The first bus units of Davao Metro Shuttle came from Nissan Diesel and Daewoo Bus. Later, they also have units from Hino. In 2008 they purchased units from Xiamen Golden Dragon Bus, the first in Mindanao, and in 2010 they purchased units from Zhengzhou Yutong Bus.

To date, the fleet of Davao Metro Shuttle is composed of buses and minibuses acquired from Yutong, Golden Dragon, Hino, Daewoo, Nissan Diesel, Hyundai and Volvo. The company was also the first in the Philippines to field buses from Vietnamese bus manufacturer THACO acquired in year 2020.

Currently, the company is the largest indigenous bus company in Mindanao, possessing more than 200 bus units including from its Go-Mindanao subsidiary.

Destinations
Despite its name, Davao Metro Shuttle not only serves the Metro Davao area. The company also operates routes in other parts of Mindanao, the Visayas and Luzon.

Davao Region

Davao Region is the main and home operational area of Davao Metro Shuttle, with the overland transport terminals of the cities of Davao and Tagum serving as its main hubs. Also, the Davao-Tagum express route had its main hub and terminal at Ayala Abreeza Mall in J.P. Laurel St., Davao City.

Living up to its name, Davao Metro Shuttle also offers city shuttle routes within Davao City as part of the city's Peak-Hour Augmentation Bus Service program. Augmenting it is its acquisition of the local city liner Annil Transport in September 2019, therefore expanding its shuttle service area within the city.
Davao
Tagum
Digos
Mati
Panabo
Compostela
Laak
Mawab
Nabunturan
New Bataan
Maragusan
Monkayo
Montevista
Pantukan
Bansalan
Matanao
Hagonoy
Padada
Santa Cruz
Sulop
Malalag
Carmen
Asuncion
San Isidro
Malita
Sta. Maria
Banaybanay
Lupon

Soccsksargen Region

Davao Metro Shuttle's North Cotabato branch and garage is located in Bartolaba Subdivision, Barangay Lanao, Kidapawan City, North Cotabato. While serving the area with its routes to the cities of Davao and Digos in Davao Region, locally it also serves the Kidapawan-Arakan route from its local hub in Kidapawan City Overland Terminal, Barangay Poblacion, Kidapawan City.
Kidapawan
Makilala
Magpet
Pres. Roxas
Antipas
Arakan

Caraga Region

Davao Metro Shuttle has its Caraga regional branch located in Barangay Bading, Butuan, Agusan del Norte. Destinations solely within Caraga region are mostly served by the company's tourist line subsidiary, Go-Mindanao Tour Bus. 

Butuan
Surigao
Bislig
Bayugan
San Francisco
Prosperidad
Talacogon
San Luis
Esperanza
Bunawan
Sibagat
La Paz
Loreto
Sta. Josefa
Veruela
Trento
Nasipit
Cabadbaran
Las Nieves
R.T. Romualdez
Jabonga
Kitcharao
Alegria
Bad-as
Tubod
Sison
Lianga
Barobo
Lingig
Hinatuan
Tagbina

Eastern Visayas
The entrance of Davao Metro Shuttle in Leyte on 5 July 2019 marked the first time the company ventured outside its main areas of operation in Mindanao and the second time the company operated outside its home operational area at Davao Region.

Ormoc
Tacloban
Calbayog
Sogod
Allen
Abuyog
Albuera
Bato
Baybay
Catbalogan
Dulag
Hilongos
Hindang
Inopacan
Bontoc
Calbiga
Gandara
Hinabangan
Javier
Jiabong
Liloan
Mahaplag
MacArthur
Mayorga
Motiong
Pagsanghan
Palo
Paranas
Pinabacdao
Pintuyan
San Isidro
San Francisco
San Ricardo
Santa Rita
Tanauan
Tarangnan
Tolosa
Victoria

Luzon

Davao Metro Shuttle acquired the Davao-Manila route via Land Transportation Franchising and Regulatory Board Resolution No. 2019-039 in early 2021. It launched the said route in 15 June 2022 with 15 bus units acquired from  THACO with the inauguration held at Parañaque Integrated Terminal Exchange (PITX) in Metro Manila, marking the first time the company rendered service within Metro Manila and Luzon and serving an inter-island overland route that spanned Luzon, Visayas and Mindanao which is the longest overland bus route in the Philippines.
Metro Manila (Parañaque Integrated Terminal Exchange)
Calamba (Turbina)
Sto. Tomas
Lucena
Tagkawayan
Naga
Daraga/Legazpi
Sorsogon
Matnog

See also
 Husky Tours
 Yellow Bus Line
 Mindanao Star
 List of bus companies of the Philippines

References

External links
Davao Metro Shuttle

Bus companies of the Philippines
Transportation in Mindanao
Companies based in Davao City
1995 establishments in the Philippines